Eremophila rigida is a flowering plant in the figwort family, Scrophulariaceae and is endemic to Western Australia. It is an erect, rigid shrub with thick, hairy, rigid leaves and pale yellowish-cream flowers.

Description
Its branches and leaves are covered with simple, silvery-grey hairs which become stained brown or reddish. The branches are rough due to persistent raised leaf bases.

There are 5 cream-coloured, overlapping, hairy sepals which have a greenish tinge but turn reddish-brown after flowering. The petal tube is cream-coloured sometimes with a lilac tinge on the upper surface. The petal tube and lobes are hairy on the outside, but the inside is glabrous except for part of the lower lobe and the inside of the tube which is filled with long, soft hairs. The 4 stamens are fully enclosed in the petal tube.

Taxonomy and naming 
This species was first formally described by Robert Chinnock in 2007 and the description was published in Eremophila and Allied Genera: A Monograph of the Plant Family Myoporaceae. The specific epithet (rigida) is a Latin word meaning "stiff", "rigid", "hard" or "inflexible" referring to the leaves of this species.

Distribution and habitat
Eremophila rigida grows on stony clay flats in open areas between Meekatharra and Newman in the Gascoyne and Pilbara biogeographic regions.

Conservation
This eremophila is classified as "Priority Three" by the Western Australian Government Department of Parks and Wildlife meaning that it is poorly known and known from only a few locations but is not under imminent threat.

Use in horticulture
The unusual, rigid foliage of this eremophila are attractions, as are the masses of flowers appearing in spring. The best colour forms are those with yellow buds which open to cream-coloured flowers. It is usually propagated by grafting onto Myoporum rootstock and grows best in well-drained soils in a sunny location. It is drought tolerant, requiring only one or two deep waterings during a long dry spell but it is only moderately frost tolerant.

References

Eudicots of Western Australia
rigida
Endemic flora of Western Australia
Plants described in 2007
Taxa named by Robert Chinnock